Are We There Yet?: World Adventure was a Canadian children's television show created by J. J. Johnson that features real-life siblings exploring the world.  The series could be seen in 7 or 30-minute formats.  The series premiered on Monday, September 3, 2007 on Treehouse TV.  Are We There Yet?: World Adventure is produced by Sinking Ship Entertainment in association with National Geographic Kids Entertainment and UNICEF.

Cast
Each episode is presented by a pair of siblings. The presenters are:
 Julian and Rosie Elia (yellow and red)
 Molly and Sam Raymond (blue and green)
 Joanna and Julia Alphonso (red and blue)
 TJ and Tristan Samuel (green and yellow)
 Charlie and Gabriel Zeifman (blue and red)
 Hillary and Emily Lizano (yellow  and green)
 Jessica and Jake Dean (red and yellow)
 Rehan and Aamil Moolla (green and blue)

Episode List

References

External links
 Are We There Yet series home page
 Treehouse TV site

2000s Canadian children's television series
2010s Canadian children's television series
2000s preschool education television series
2010s preschool education television series
2007 Canadian television series debuts
2011 Canadian television series endings
Canadian preschool education television series
Treehouse TV original programming
Television series by Corus Entertainment
Canadian children's adventure television series
Television series about children
Television series about siblings